Enterprise High School (EHS) is located in Enterprise, Utah, in the southwest part of the state, United States, and is the only 2A public high school in Washington County School District. Enterprise High School's nickname and mascot is the Wolves; the student section is referred to as the Wolf Pack.  Enterprise was established in 1896.  It was settled by members of the Church of Jesus Christ of Latter-Day Saints who were called to settle the area by church leaders.  Shortly thereafter, in 1898, a board of trustees was elected to oversee the needs of the 58 children in the community.  The first classes were held in a one-room brick home.  When the Young Men's Mutual Hall was completed one year later, the school moved into that building.  As the community grew, more space was needed and classes were held at various locations and homes in the community.  By 1917, the steadily increasing population had created a need for a more permanent school building.  Construction began in 1921 on a new nine-room school building, which was completed in January 1922.  Until 1922, only grades one through eight were held.  With the construction of the new building, grades nine and ten were added.  Students in eleventh and twelfth grades who wished to complete their education traveled north to Parowan.  The latter two grades were added in 1927.  For many years thereafter, grades one through 12 were held in the same building.  In 1986, a new building was erected a few blocks southeast of the old school to house grades seven through 12.  Most of the old school was demolished and a new elementary school built in its place.

Sports
EHS competes in the 2A division in region 18 with other southern Utah schools in Beaver, Iron, Kane, and Millard counties. Its Football team competes in 2A South, one of two divisions for football that also includes Sevier county. Enterprise will remain in 2A Region 18 (and 2A South) for the 2019-2021 classification period.
Enterprise High School's sports teams are known as the "Enterprise Wolves" and are a part of the Utah High School Activities Association uhsaa.org.

Baseball 
Enterprise has won 11 state baseball championships in 1984, 1985, 1986, 1987, 1988, 1992, 1993, 1994, 1996, 2011, and 2016.

Basketball 
Enterprise has won 4 state basketball championships in 1986, 1987, 1988, and 1994.

Cross Country 
Enterprise has won 4 state cross country championships in 1971, 1975, 1986, and 2009.

Drill Team 
Enterprise has won 1 state drill team championship in 2021.

Football 
Enterprise has won 1 state football championship in 2003.

Girls Basketball 
Enterprise has won 7 state girls basketball championships in 1990, 1992, 1995, 1996, 1999, 2011, and 2014.

Softball 
Enterprise has won 2 state softball championships in 2019 (2020 - COVID-19 year) and 2021.

Volleyball 
Enterprise has won 6 state volleyball championships in 1989, 1990, 1991, 2013, 2014, and 2019.

All-Sports Award 
Enterprise has won 2 all-sports awards in 1993-1994 and 1994–1995.

Demographics
Enterprise High School is considered by the NCES to be Rural, Remote 43 which is Census-defined rural territory that is more than 25 miles from an urbanized area and is also more than 10 miles from an urban cluster. NCES reports that 32.5% of students at EHS are considered free lunch eligible, and 15% reduced-price lunch eligible.

References

External links

 Washington County School District
 Enterprise High School website
 Boundaries
 List of high schools in Utah

Public high schools in Utah
1922 establishments in Utah
Schools in Washington County, Utah